is a Japanese voice actress who is affiliated with AT Production. She was born in Kagoshima Prefecture and grew up in Nakano, Tokyo.

Filmography
 2005: Jinki:EXTEND as Akao Hiiragi/Akana Oike
 2005: Happy Seven as Amano Sakogami
 2005-2006: SoltyRei as Illumina Kisch
 2006: Galaxy Angel II: Zettai Ryōiki no Tobira (Galaxy Angel II series) as Apricot Sakuraba
 2006: Galaxy Angel Rune (Galaxy Angel II series) as Apricot Sakuraba
 2006: True Tears (game) as Yuzuko Sanada
 2006-2010: Reborn! as Kyoko Sasagawa
 2007: Darker than Black as Mayu Ōtsuka
2007: Galaxy Angel II: Mugen Kairō no Kagi (Galaxy Angel II series) as Apricot Sakuraba
 2008: Mission-E as Maori Kimizuka
 2009: Galaxy Angel II: Eigō Kaiki no Toki (Galaxy Angel II series) as Apricot Sakuraba
 2010: Shin Koihime Musō: Otome Tairan as Gotsutotsukotsu
 2010: Z.H.P. Unlosing Ranger VS Darkdeath Evilman (game) as Etranger/Super Baby
 2011: Moe Moe Daisensou Gengaiban + (game) as Blanche
 2014: Yu-Gi-Oh! Arc-V as Yuzu Hiragi, Serena
 2015: Yu-Gi-Oh! Arc-V Tag Force Special (Yu-Gi-Oh! Arc-V) Yuzu Hiragi (game)
 2017: Azur Lane (game) as HMS Hermes

References

External links

sorachoco official web site | 空とちょこと泉 
 Yūna Inamura at GamePlaza-Haruka Voice Acting Database 
 Yūna Inamura at Hitoshi Doi's Seiyuu Database

1982 births
Japanese radio personalities
Japanese voice actresses
Living people
Actors from Kagoshima Prefecture